Suvigya Sharma (born 28 July 1983) is an Indian artist, painter, fashion designer, who does miniature paintings, Tanjore painting, fresco work and portraits. He has worked in restoring fresco painting at City Palace at Jaipur, Jama Masjid and Singapore Art Museum. His works fall under miniature art work in India.

In February, 2016, Suvigya Sharma his art work Timeless Miniature Art  was showcased at Make in India event, with a live demonstration of Miniature-painting technologies in Mumbai.

Early life and education
Suvigya Sharma was born on 28 July 1983 in Jaipur of Indian state Rajasthan to R.K. Sharma, an artist.  He did his schooling from Maharaja Sawai Mansingh School and Bharatiya Vidya Bhavan's Vidyashram. Later he graduated from Bhawanipur Education Society College, Kolkata. He also studied Foreign Trade & Export Management from Symbiosis International University, Pune. He started painting at the age of seven. He used to teach dance way back when he was a teenager, said in an interview with DNA.

Career 
Suvigya has worked on fresco in Jaipur and other places like Havelis in Udaipur and Kishangarh, Jama Masjid's gold leafing, a few section of Jaipur City Palace, Bungalows, Dargah, heritage properties in different part of India.

Some of his clients for whom he painted, includes L. N. Mittal, Sachin Tendulkar, Narendra Modi, Priyanka Chopra, Aditya Chopra, Rani Mukherji Sanjay Dutt, Manyata Dutt, Kangana Ranaut B. S. Yediyurappa, Virat Kohli, Justin Bieber and business families such as the Ambanis, the Birlas, the Burmans, the Singhanias, the Piramal, the Bajaj. Suvigya has also painted for PM Narendra Modi, Barack Obama, Hillary Clinton and Dalai Lama.

His art works have been unveiled by Kangana Ranaut, Madhoo, Rani Mukherji Vikas Khanna and Sachin Tendulkar at various events organised by himself which some of his artworks used 24 carat gold as material.

He has been exhibited in galleries and museums such as Academy of Fine Arts, Kolkata, Cymroza Art Gallery, Kamalnayan Bajaj Art Gallery, Chitrakoot Art Gallery, India Habitat Centre, Artisans Art Gallery He designed the cover page of chef Vikas Khanna's cookbook Utsav, which had its worth ₹35 Lakh ($51,590.00)., Gallery Navrathan and Vasantha Art Gallery.

On 4 October 2016, Suvigya gifted Sachin Tendulkar with a handmade memento -a custom-made gold-leaved and gold-embossed bat with a 24 carat gold handle at the opening of his show The Art of Royals, reportedly by Times of India.

On 10 May 2017, during The Purpose Tour concert in India, Suvigya Sharma commissioned a life-size oil on canvas portrait for Justin Bieber and presented it to him at St. Regis in Lower Parel, Mumbai. In May, 2017, he commissioned a lifelike portrait for prime minister Narendra Modi.

In 2021, Suvigya created a series of Non-Fungible Tokens (NFTs) featuring artworks focusing on wildlife. The collection includes depictions of the near-extinct polar bear and rhinoceros placed against highly-detailed hyper-realistic 3D backgrounds.

Collaboration with Make in India 
In February 2016, Sharma, was invited to showcase his work for Government of India's initiative Make in India, followed by a live demonstration of Miniature-painting technologies by him.

Charity 
In June 2016, Suvigya Sharma participated along with artists Uddhav Thackeray, Ajay De, Sudharak Olwe, Brinda Miller, Rajiv Menon in fund raiser art-exhibition for Nargis Dutt Cancer Foundation in Mumbai, which was organized by Priya Dutt.

Exhibitions

Personal life 
Suvigya's wife name is Charu, and the couple has a son named Abhigya.

Recognition 
In January, 2017, he was appointed as the Goodwill Ambassador of Rajasthan by Smile Foundation.

In September 2021, the International Delphic Council appointed Sharma as an Honorary Member of the Advisory Board Maharashtra with the aim of promoting art and culture. In 2023, he was inducted into the list of 'Prominent Rajasthanis' by the Government of Rajasthan.

See also 

 List of Indian artists
 List of people from Rajasthan

References

External links 
 A modernist twist to miniature art at Deccan Herald

Indian male fashion designers
Artists from Jaipur
Artists from Mumbai
1983 births
Living people
Indian portrait painters
Indian male painters
Painters from Rajasthan
Bhawanipur Education Society College alumni
University of Calcutta alumni